is a Japanese track and field sprinter who specialises in the 200 metres. He is the 2014 National champion in the event and has a personal best of 20.33 seconds. He has also 10.13 seconds in the 100 metres. He competed at the 2014 Asian Games and the 2015 Asian Championships.

Personal bests

International competitions

National title

Notes

References

External links

Shota Hara at JAAF 
Shota Hara at Suzuki Athlete Club 

Living people

Japanese male sprinters
Jobu University alumni

Asian Games silver medalists for Japan

1992 births
Sportspeople from Nagano Prefecture
Athletes (track and field) at the 2014 Asian Games
Japan Championships in Athletics winners
Medalists at the 2014 Asian Games
Asian Games medalists in athletics (track and field)
21st-century Japanese people